Muhammad Taqi Aljaafari Bin Jahari (born 25 October 1986) is a Singaporean international football referee. He has been a FIFA listed referee since 2012, and has also refereed a number of AFC Champions League matches. Taqi Aljaafari has also refereed matches in the 2017 FIFA U-17 World Cup in India.

Career
Taqi became a Fifa-listed referee in 2012.

In 2013, he officiated the RHB Singapore Cup Final 2013 between Tanjong Pagar United Football Club and Home United Football Club, which Home United won 4–1.

In 2014, he had a double in his career. He refereed the 2014 Singapore Charity Shield and 2014 RHB Singapore Cup Final. He was also award with S.League referee of the year itself.

In 2015, he was sent to Australia for being one of the support referees for the 2015 AFC Asian Cup with his assistant Jeffrey Goh.

In May 2017, he became one of the video referees for the 2017 FIFA U-20 World Cup In South Korea. In July, he officiated the 2017 International Champions Cup match in Singapore between English champions Chelsea and German champions Bayern Munich. It ended with a 3–2 for Bayern.

Taqi was named AFF Referee Of The Year 2017.

In October 2017, he was sent to India to officiate 2 group stage matches in the  2017 FIFA U-17 World Cup.

He officiated the 2017 Singapore Cup Final between Albirex Niigata (S) and Global Cebu F.C.

He was selected by AFC for the 2019 AFC Asian Cup held in the UAE to officiate some matches.

He was sent to Poland to officiate some matches for the 2019 FIFA U-20 World Cup.

In 2021, Taqi was Singapore's first Fifa video assistant referee (VAR) and officiated at the 2020 Summer Olympics held at Japan.

In 2022, Taqi was selected as a VAR to officiate the 2022 FIFA World Cup.

Personal life 
Taqi is married and has two sons and a daughter.

FIFA tournaments

AFC Asian Cup

Honours
S. League Referee Of The Year, 2014
AFF Referee Of The Year, 2017

References

1986 births
Living people
Singaporean football referees
AFC Asian Cup referees
Singaporean people of Iranian descent